Mohammad Sami, FASc & FNASc... (born 5 February 1955) is an Indian theoretical physicist and cosmologist, known for his work on dark energy. A research paper known as "Dynamics of Dark Energy", co-authored by him, has found place in the elite document titled as "Scientific Background on the Nobel Prize in Physics" (2011), compiled by the Class for Physics of the Royal Swedish Academy of Sciences on the accelerating universe. He is currently a professor at Center for Cosmology and Science Popularization at the SGT University, Gurgaon.

Early life and education
M. Sami was selected for the Indo-USSR Scholarship in 1972 for higher education while studying in B.Sc. (1st Year) in Aligarh Muslim University at Aligarh, Uttar Pradesh. He studied at the Department of Theoretical Physics at People's Friendship University, Moscow, Russia. After completing M.Sc., he shifted to Moscow State University in 1979 and pursued Ph.D. in High Energy Physics under a renowned Theoretical Physicist Prof. V. Ya. Fainberg on the topic “Higgs Boson Production in lepton-lepton and hadron-hadron Collisions”.

Career
After completing his Ph.D. in 1983, he joined the Poona University and later shifted to Jamia Millia Islamia as lecturer in 1985. In the year 2002, he was invited to the Inter-University Centre for Astronomy and Astrophysics (IUCAA), Pune as a visiting scientist for a period of three years.

In 2006, the Centre for Theoretical Physics (CTP) was established at Jamia Millia Islamia, New Delhi, and Prof. M. Sami was appointed its first director. He has engaged in teaching and research for more than three decades. He is also the visiting professor at Maulana Azad National Urdu University (A Central University), Hyderabad, Telangana, India and the Zhejiang University of Technology, China.

He was on the Member Governing Board of IUCAA, Pune and is one of the Vice Presidents of the BRICS Association of Gravity, Astrophysics and Cosmology (BRICS-AGAC) from India. To his credit there are eighty six (86) research papers of high impact factor having citations around 10,000. He is also the editor of International Journal of Modern Physics D (IJMPD).

Prof. Sami is a fellow of the National Academy of Sciences as well as Indian Academy of Sciences, Bangalore. He has been a visiting scientist at CERN Geneva, NTHU Taiwan, IPMU  University of Tokyo Japan, Eurasian National University, Astana, Kazakhstan, Senior Associate at ICTP Trieste Italy, JSPS Fellow (both long and short term), Nagoya University, Japan.

He has undertaken various National and International Research Projects with the Department of Science and Technology. (Government of India, New Delhi)

Awards and distinctions
The President of India conferred the Visitor’s Award for path breaking research carried out in the field of Contemporary Issues in Cosmology and Astrophysics, to the Cosmology and Astrophysics Research Group led by Prof. M. Sami, Centre for Theoretical Physics, Jamia Millia Islamia, consisting of Prof. Anjan A. Sen, Prof. Sushant G. Ghosh and Prof. Sanjay Jhingan, in the year 2015.

On 4 February 2015, the President of India presented the Visitor’s Award in Durbar Hall at Rashtrapati Bhavan. Padma Vibhushan Jayant V. Narlikar nominated him for Padma Shri Award 2018 in the field of science and technology.

References

Indian physicists
1955 births
Living people